Steven Croft may refer to:

Steven Croft (bishop) (born 1957), Anglican bishop of Oxford
Steven Croft (cricketer) (born 1984), English cricketer
Steven Croft (snooker player), played in the 2004 World Snooker Championship
Steven Croft (soccer player), listed in the All-time Albany BWP Highlanders roster
Stephen Croft, character in Aces High (film)

See also
Steve Kroft (born 1945), American journalist
Steven's Croft power station